The 1981 Individual Speedway Junior European Championship was the fifth edition of the European Under-21 Championships.

European final
July 18, 1981
 Slaný, AK Slaný speedway

References

1981
European Individual U-21
1981 in Czechoslovak sport
Speedway competitions in the Czech Republic